Lamson is an unincorporated community in Collinwood Township, Meeker County, Minnesota, United States, near Dassel.  The community is located along Meeker County Road 5 near 740th Avenue.

References

Unincorporated communities in Minnesota
Unincorporated communities in Meeker County, Minnesota